On 19 November 1968, a B-52 crashed at Kadena Air Base, on the island of Okinawa, Japan.

Aborted takeoff
The United States Air Force (USAF) Strategic Air Command (SAC) B-52D Stratofortress (serial number 55-0103) of the 4252d Strategic Wing had a full bomb load and broke up and caught fire after the aircraft aborted takeoff at Kadena Air Base while it was conducting an Operation Arc Light bombing mission to South Vietnam during the Vietnam War.

Resultant fire and explosion

Recovery and investigation
The aircraft was reduced "to a black spot on the runway" The blast was so large that Air Force spokesman had to announce that there had only been conventional bombs on board. Nothing remained of the aircraft except landing gear and engine assemblies, the tail turret, a few bombs, and some loose explosive that had not detonated. Very small fragments of aircraft metal from the enormous blast were "spread like confetti," leaving the crew to use a double entendre to refer to the cleanup work, calling it, "'52 Pickup." The Electronic Warfare Officer and the Crew Chief later died from burn injuries after being evacuated from Okinawa. Two Okinawan workers were also injured in the blasts.

The Chibana depot stored ammunition, bombs, high explosives, and tens of thousands artillery shells and is now known to have held warheads for 19 different atomic and thermonuclear weapons systems in the hardened weapon storage areas. The weapons included W28 warheads used in the MGM-13 Mace cruise missile and W31 warheads used in MGR-1 Honest John and MIM-14 Nike-Hercules (Nike-H) missiles.

The storage depot at Chibana also included 52 igloos in the Project Red Hat chemical weapons storage area and presumably Project 112's biological Agents.

The crash led to demands to remove the B-52s from Okinawa and strengthened a push for the reversion from U.S. rule in Okinawa. Okinawans had correctly suspected that the Chibana depot held nuclear weapons. The crash sparked fears that another potential disaster on the island could put the chemical and nuclear stockpile and the surrounding population in jeopardy and increased the urgency of moving them to a less populated and less active storage location.

See also 

 1959 Okinawa F-100 crash
 1964 Machida F-8 crash
 1977 Yokohama F-4 crash

References
 Notes

20th-century military history of the United States
Aviation accidents and incidents in 1968
Okinawa
Accidents and incidents involving United States Air Force aircraft
Aviation accidents and incidents in Japan
November 1968 events in Asia
1968 in Japan